Lego Vidiyo was a Lego theme that allows children to create their own music videos and dance clips using a range of Lego toy sets and an associated app. It is licensed from Universal Music Group. The theme was first introduced in March 2021, before being discontinued by the end of January 2022 after being deemed a commercial disaster.

Overview 
Lego Vidiyo is a music video maker brand that combines music with Lego playsets. Users create their own music videos featuring Lego minifigures by using an app named Vidiyo. The product line includes BeatBox toy sets that each contain a minifigure and connect to the app. The associated toy sets include Lego tiles called BeatBits that unlock digital and audio effects. The toy sets are marketed at children aged 7 to 10 years old.

Development 
Lego Vidiyo was created in collaboration with Universal Music Group (UMG). The theme was developed with the aim of blending physical play with digital play. The associated app was designed to use augmented reality (AR) to create the illusion of Lego minifigures coming to life and moving to music. Early concept art for the app experience was created in February 2018 and a sketch design for the BeatBoxes was created in April 2018. As part of the collaboration with Universal Music Group, a record deal was signed with the Universal Music Group label, Astralwerks. The deal involved the release of a single titled Shake. On April 27, 2021, eight additions to Lego Vidiyo were unveiled, including two BeatBoxes, 12 Bandmates, and five Stage Models.

On July 23, 2021, The Lego Group released a statement that confirmed that Lego Vidiyo would go on hiatus for 2022 following feedback relating to the play experience. The company stated that the theme would continue to be available and that The Lego Group and Universal Music Group were planning to, "pilot some new ideas in 2022, then release new play experiences in 2023 and beyond." However, after "extensive quantitative and qualitative research" was conducted, The Lego Group decided to discontinue the Vidiyo theme after January 31, 2022.

Launch 
Lego Vidiyo was announced on January 26, 2021, with the first associated products released in March 2021. In addition, The Lego Group built a life-sized model of a Lego Vidiyo Beatbox in Sydney Harbour. An event named Vidiyo Music Fest was planned to tour several Legoland resorts in August and September 2021 to promote the theme.

Toy line 
According to Bricklink, The Lego Group has released a total of 42 Lego sets of Lego Vidiyo theme. The product line was discontinued by the end of January 2022.

Bandmates 
Bandmates - Series 1 was released on March 1, 2021, and included 12 characters. Each of the sets contains a Bandmates minifigure and three BeatBits. The twelve collectible minifigures are Ice Cream Saxophonist, Samurapper, Shark Singer, DJ Cheetah, Genie Dancer, Discowboy, Red Panda Dancer, Banshee Singer, Alien Keytarist, Cotton Candy Cheerleader, Bunny Dancer and Werewolf Drummer. In September 2021, The Lego Group announced the sets were to be retired on January 31, 2022.

Bandmates - Series 2 was released on October 1, 2021, and includes 12 characters. Each of the sets contains a Bandmates minifigure and three BeatBits. The twelve collectible minifigures are Zombie Dancer, DJ Beatbox, Slime Singer, DJ Captain, Alien Dancer, Karaoke Mermaid, Dragon Guitarist, Vampire Bassist, Puppy Singer, DJ Rasp-Beary, Discowgirl Guitarist and Carnival Dancer. In September 2021, The Lego Group announced the sets were to be retired on January 31, 2022.

BeatBoxes 
The first wave of BeatBoxes sets were released along with Bandmates. Each of the BeatBoxes contains a minifigure, fourteen random BeatBits and two special BeatBits. The Beatboxes can store the BeatBits and minifigure. The six BeatBoxes being released were Candy Mermaid, Punk Pirate, Alien DJ, Party Llama, Unicorn DJ and Robot Break-dancer. In September 2021, The Lego Group announced the sets were to be retired on January 31, 2022.

The second wave of BeatBoxes sets was released along with Stage Models on August 1, 2021. Each of the BeatBoxes contains a minifigure, fourteen random BeatBits and two special BeatBits. The two BeatBoxes being released are Metal Dragon and Folk Fairy. In September 2021, The Lego Group announced the sets were to be retired on 31 January 31, 2022.

Stage Models 
Stage Models is a series of sets that were released in June 2021. Each of the sets contains a performance stage, minifigures with accessories, fourteen random BeatBits and four special BeatBits. The five Stage Models released were Candy Castle Stage, Robo HipHop Car, K-Pawp Concert, Punk Pirate Ship and The Boombox. In September 2021, The Lego Group announced the sets were to be retired on January 31, 2022.

Web shorts 
Two web shorts were released on YouTube to promote the theme.

 Shake is an official music video released on YouTube. It is performed by L.L.A.M.A (Love, Laughter, And Music Always), NE-YO and Carmen DeLeon.
 Building Working DJ Decks from LEGO Bricks is an official web short released on YouTube. It features Sam Battle building DJ Decks with Lego Bricks with a combination of Lego Mindstorms, Lego Technic and a Lego-compatible circuit board. L.L.A.M.A also made a special appearance.

Video game and app

Lego Brawls 

A crossover mobile fighting game named Lego Brawls was developed by RED Games. Lego Brawls was released for Apple Arcade on September 19, 2019, for iOS devices, and for PC and Consoles in June 2022. It includes Punk Pirate as an unlockable champion and other Vidiyo characters and accessories as cosmetic elements. A Vidiyo-themed arena is also featured.

App 
The Lego Vidiyo app was released on March 1, 2021, and is the mobile app for the Lego Vidiyo theme. It is available for the operating systems iOS and Android. The app allows the user to choose different songs from the app, scan minifigure characters with the BeatBits to unlock digital effects and set the stage to perform their own 60-second music video. It can also send the music video to other the users in the app.

Other merchandise 
The Vidiyo brand has also produced clothing and accessories for children and young adults, including collaborations with Adidas in 2021.

Awards and nominations 
In May 2021, Lego Vidiyo was awarded "Smart Toy Awards 2021" and also "Innovation" by the World Economic Forum.

See also
Lego Ultra Agents
Lego Life of George
Lego Fusion
Nexo Knights
Lego Minifigures (theme)
Lego Monster Fighters
Lego BrickHeadz
Lego Hidden Side
Lego Jurassic World (theme)
Lego Super Mario
Lego Trolls World Tour
Lego Minions: The Rise of Gru

Notes

References

External links
 

Lego themes
Products introduced in 2021
Universal Music Group
Products and services discontinued in 2022